Phú Bình is a rural district of Thái Nguyên province in the Northeast region of Vietnam. As of 2003 the district had a population of 139,753. The district covers an area of 249 km². The district capital lies at Hương Sơn.

Administrative divisions
Hương Sơn, Bàn Đạt, Bảo Lý, Dương Thành, Đào Xá, Điềm Thụy, Đồng Liên, Hà Châu, Kha Sơn, Lương Phú, Nga My, Nhã Lộng, Tân Đức, Tân Hòa, Tân Khánh, Tân Kim, Tân Thành, Thanh Ninh, Thượng Đình, Úc Kỳ, Xuân Phương.

References

Districts of Thái Nguyên province
Thái Nguyên province